Sassacus vitis is a species of jumping spider. It is native to North America, with a range spanning from Canada to Panama. These spiders are normally no larger than five millimetres, with females being much larger than males, and duller in color. Because of their small size, these spiders feed primarily on small insects such as flies.

References

External links

Sassacus vitis at Worldwide database of jumping spiders
Sassacus vitis at Global Species Database of Salticidae (Araneae)

Salticidae
Spiders described in 1894
Spiders of North America